Elections to the Baseball Hall of Fame for 1954 followed a system practically the same as in 1952 because the new Veterans Committee was meeting only in odd-number years (until 1962).
The Baseball Writers' Association of America (BBWAA) voted by mail to select from recent players and elected three: Bill Dickey, Rabbit Maranville, and Bill Terry. A formal induction ceremony was held in Cooperstown, New York, on August 9, 1954, with Commissioner of Baseball Ford Frick presiding.

BBWAA election
Any candidate receiving votes on at least 75% of the ballots would be honored with induction to the Hall. Votes were cast for 53 players; a total of 252 ballots were cast, with 189 votes required for election. A total of 2,091 individual votes were cast, an average of 8.30 per ballot.

The three candidates who received 75% of the vote and were elected are indicated in bold italics; candidates who have since been elected in subsequent elections are indicated in italics.
 
Players were eligible if they had finished their career between 1928 and 1952. Starting with this election, players had to have been retired from baseball (including no longer working as a manager) for a minimum of five seasons to be eligible, unless they had received at least 100 votes in the prior year's election—those who qualified under this clause were Joe DiMaggio and Ted Lyons.

References

External links
1954 Election at www.baseballhalloffame.org

Baseball Hall of Fame balloting
Hall of Fame balloting